"She Wants to Rock" is a song co-written and recorded by American country music duo The Warren Brothers.  It was released in May 1999 as the third single from the album Beautiful Day in the Cold Cruel World.  The song reached #37 on the Billboard Hot Country Singles & Tracks chart.  The song was written by Brad Warren, Brett Warren and Rob Stoney.

Chart performance

References

1999 singles
1998 songs
The Warren Brothers songs
Songs written by the Warren Brothers
Song recordings produced by Chris Farren (country musician)
BNA Records singles